Sitamarhi Assembly constituency is an assembly constituency in Sitamarhi district in the Indian state of Bihar. In 2015 Bihar Legislative Assembly election, Sitamarhi will be one of the 36 seats to have VVPAT enabled electronic voting machines.

Overview
As per Delimitation of Parliamentary and Assembly constituencies Order, 2008, 28. Sitamarhi Assembly constituency is composed of the following: Dumra community development block.

Sitamarhi Assembly constituency is part of 5. Sitamarhi (Lok Sabha constituency).

Members of Legislative Assembly

Election results

2020

References

External links
 

Assembly constituencies of Bihar
Politics of Sitamarhi district